Shirak is a village in the Akhuryan Municipality of the Shirak Province of Armenia, belongs to the Marmashen community.

Demographics

References 

World Gazeteer: Armenia – World-Gazetteer.com

Populated places in Shirak Province